John David Casson CMG (born 4 June 1971) is a British diplomat, who served as the British Ambassador to Egypt from August 2014 to August 2018.

Early life 
John David Casson was born in Birmingham, United Kingdom on 4 June 1971. Casson was born to Reverend David and Helen Casson.

Casson was educated at Ashcroft High School in Luton, Bedfordshire and Tiffin School, a boys' grammar school in Kingston upon Thames, London. After Tiffin, Casson attended Richmond upon Thames College.

Career

Ambassador to Egypt 
Casson was appointed the British Ambassador to Egypt in August 2014 until August 2018.

In May 2015, Casson faced criticism on Twitter after making a joke referencing a recent Egyptian political controversy.

Casson has been the leader of the disability charity L’Arche in the United Kingdom since January 2021.

Personal life 
Casson married his wife, Kathryn Rachel Clarke, in 2000. Casson speaks fluent Arabic. Casson identifies as a Christian. He was appointed Companion of the Order of St Michael and St George (CMG) in the 2014 Birthday Honours list.

References

External links 

 

Ambassadors of the United Kingdom to Egypt
21st-century British diplomats
1971 births
Living people
Companions of the Order of St Michael and St George